The Democratic Republic of the Congo was a net energy exporter in 2008. Most energy was consumed domestically in 2008. According to the IEA statistics the energy export was in 2008 small and less than from the Republic of Congo. 2010 population figures were 3.8 million for the RC compared to CDR 67.8 Million.

Electricity
The Democratic Republic of the Congo has reserves of petroleum, natural gas, coal, and a potential hydroelectric power generating capacity of around 100,000 MW. The Inga Dam on the Congo River has the potential capacity to generate 40,000 to 45,000 MW of electric power, sufficient to supply the electricity needs of the whole Southern Africa region. Ongoing uncertainties in the political arena, and a resulting lack of interest from investors has meant that the Inga Dam's potential has been limited.

In 2001, the dam was estimated to have an installed generating capacity of 2,473 MW. It is estimated that the dam is capable of producing no more than 650–750 MW, because two-thirds of the facility's turbines do not work. The African Development bank agreed to supply $8 million towards dam expansion. The government has also agreed to strengthen the Inga-kolwezi and Inga-South Africa interconnections and to construct a 2nd power line to supply power to Kinshasa.

In 2007, the DR Congo had a gross production of public and self-produced electricity of 8,302 million kWh.  The DR Congo imported 78 million kWh of electricity in 2007. The DR Congo is also an exporter of electric power. In 2003, electric power exports came to 1.3 TWh, with power transmitted to the Republic of Congo and its capital, Brazzaville, as well as to Zambia and South Africa. There were plans to build the Western Power Corridor (Westcor) to supply electricity from Inga III hydroelectric power plant to the Democratic Republic of the Congo, Angola, Namibia, Botswana and South Africa.

The national power company is Société nationale d'électricité (SNEL).

Only 13% of the country has access to electricity. As of 2003, 98.2% of electricity was produced by hydroelectric power.

The DRC a member of three electrical power pools: SAPP (Southern African Power Pool), EAPP (East African Power Pool), and CAPP (Central African Power Pool).

Hydropower

The country has vast potential in hydroelectricity. The second stage of the hydroelectric dam was completed in 1982 on the lower Congo River at Inga Falls, with a large portion of its power production supplying hydroelectricity to the mining industry and Kinshasa. Further plans are to build the proposed 11,050 MW Inga III hydropower project with the construction of two dams. There will be approximately 2,000 km and 3,000 km of transmissions lines within the DRC and across its borders respectively. The Inga III hydropower project is expected to electrify Kinshasa, lead to the development of the DRC’s mining sector, and exported hydroelectricity.

Petroleum
The DROC has crude oil reserves that are second only to Angola's in southern Africa.

In 2007, the DROC produced 836,000 metric tons of crude petroleum, exported 836,000 metric tons and had a reserve of 25,000,000 metric tons. The DROC had no refining capacity as of January 1, 2005, and must import refined petroleum products.

Oil product imports consist of gasoline, jet fuel, kerosene, aviation gas, fuel oil, and liquefied petroleum gas. Oil products are exported and imported by Cohydro and Dalbit Petroleum. Dalbit Petroleum is a Kenya based energy company that supplies products to Lubumbashi and North Eastern DRC. The DRC held  of proven gas reserves as of 2017.  There was no production, consumption or importation or exportation of natural gas.
Galaxy Moriah Oil is the government contracted supplier of oil for the DROC.

Coal
As of July 2005, the DROC is reported to have coal reserves of 97 million short tons. Domestic coal production and consumption in 2003 totaled 0.11 million short tons and 0.26 million shorts tons, respectively.

Renewable energy (other than hydroelectric)
ICTs for climate change mitigation

One of the UN Millennium Development Goals is to make the benefits of new technologies - especially information and communications technologies (ICTs) – available to both industrialized nations and developing regions.  In light of these goals, several projects have been founded by the International Telecommunication Union (ITU), Organisation for Economic Co-operation and Development (OECD), World Wide Fund for Nature (WWF), and other organisations in order to explore ICTs and climate change.

Climate Change Legislation

DRC has no national climate change policy and strategy which can present the DRC’s current and future efforts to effectively address its climate change vulnerability and adaptation.  It currently relies on environment-related policies and action plans to implement climate change initiatives and activities.  Nevertheless, several NGOs and donor agencies have been active in the DRC to develop an administrative structure to address the needs of environmental protection and natural resources management.

The DRC is in a very high level sun belt that makes the installation of photovoltaic systems and the use of thermal solar systems viable throughout the country. Currently there are 836 solar power systems, with a total power of 83 kW, located in Equateur (167), Katanga (159), Nord-Kivu (170), the two Kasaï provinces (170), and Bas-Congo (170). There is also the 148 Caritas network system, with a total power of 6.31 kW7. The potential for further solar development is high.

The DRC has a wide diversity of natural resources, allowing it to consider a significant growth in hydro, wind and solar energy.  It has been called "a virtual continent."  For the first time in Africa, the Democratic Republic of Congo (DRC) has adopted an interactive atlas of renewable energy sources.

This Atlas was created by the UNDP, Netherlands Development Organization SNV, and the Congolese Ministry of Water Resources and Electricity.  It has 600 interactive maps and informs policymaking on decentralizing energy and encourages further renewable energy investments.

See also

 List of power stations in Congo
 Inga dams
Renewable energy by country

References